Peter Karel Alexander Vanvelthoven (born 22 October 1962) is a Belgian politician and member of the SP.A. He is the son of politician . He became the Federal Minister for Employment, charged with the Informatisation of the State, in 2005 after Deputy Prime Minister and Minister of Budget Johan Vande Lanotte left the Federal Government to become the President of the Different Socialist Party (SP.A).

Political career

1994-1995: Provincial Councillor of Limburg
1995: Permanent Deputy of Limburg
1995-1999: Member of the Flemish Parliament for Limburg
1999-2003: Member of the Chamber of Representatives for Limburg
2003-2005: Secretary of State for the Informatisation of the State, attached to the Minister of Budget and Public Enterprises
2005-2008: Federal Minister for Employment and Informatisation
2008-2009: Member of the Chamber of Representatives for Limburg and leader of the socialist fraction
2009–present: Member of the Flemish Parliament for Limburg and leader of the socialist fraction

Honours 
:  Grand Officer Order of Leopold
 : Knight, Order of Orange-Nassau

References

External links
  

1962 births
Vanvelthovenn Peter
Socialistische Partij Anders politicians
Members of the Flemish Parliament
Members of the Belgian Federal Parliament
People from Lommel
Mayors of places in Belgium
Government ministers of Belgium
Vrije Universiteit Brussel alumni
Ghent University alumni
21st-century Belgian politicians